Chey Chettha III (1639–1673) or Batom Reachea II was a Cambodian king from 1672 to 1673. 

Chey Chettha III was the only son of Batom Reachea. In 1671, he became the son-in-law of his uncle, King Barom Reachea V, by marrying his eldest daughter, Princess Sri Thida Kshatriyi. In December 1672, he murdered his father-in-law and seized the throne, and forced his cousin Bhagavatti Dav Kshatriyi (also the wife of his uncle Prince Ang Tan) to be his wife.

Chey Chettha III was assassinated by the Chams and Malays in the employ of his wife, Gama Kshatriyi, just five months after his coronation, in April (or May) 1673.

References

 Phoeun Mak, Dharma Po. « La deuxième intervention militaire vietnamienne au Cambodge (1673-1679)» dans: Bulletin de l'École française d'Extrême-Orient. Tome 77, 1988. p.229-262.
 Chroniques Royales du Cambodge de 1594 à 1677. École française d'Extrême Orient. Paris 1981 
 Achille Dauphin-Meunier  Histoire du Cambodge Presses universitaires de France, Paris 1968 Que sais-je ? n° 916. 

1639 births
1673 deaths
17th-century Cambodian monarchs
Assassinated people
Mariticides
17th-century murdered monarchs
People murdered in Cambodia